Prickett is an English surname of Anglo-Saxon origins.  It may refer to:

Charles Prickett, English cricketer
Henry E. Prickett, American politician
Maudie Prickett, American actress
Richard Prickett
Thomas Prickett, Royal Air Force officer

See also
Abacuk Pricket, English sailor
Prickett's Fort State Park, a West Virginia state park

English-language surnames